King and Queen Courthouse Green Historic District is a national historic district located at King and Queen Court House, near Shacklefords, King and Queen County, Virginia.  It encompasses eight contributing buildings, seven contributing structures, and two contributing objects in the county seat of King and Queen County. The district includes a small courthouse compound with a courthouse, clerk's office, and county jail (partially delineated by a brick wall), a granite monument and brick wall, a hotel / tavern building, a school, a specialty store building (currently used to house state offices), and a residence on the site of another hotel and tavern.

It was listed on the National Register of Historic Places in 1998.

Confederate Monument
The granite obelisk (pictured) was erected in 1913 and is located on the old court house grounds.  The monument displays various symbols of the war and the below inscription:

References

External links
 King & Queen Courthouse Tavern Museum: Courthouse Historic District

Confederate States of America monuments and memorials in Virginia
Courthouses on the National Register of Historic Places in Virginia
Historic districts on the National Register of Historic Places in Virginia
County courthouses in Virginia
Buildings and structures in King and Queen County, Virginia
National Register of Historic Places in King and Queen County, Virginia
Government buildings completed in 1864